The Road to Hell is the tenth studio album by British singer-songwriter Chris Rea, released in 1989. Coming on the back of several strongly performing releases, it is Rea's most successful studio album, and topped the UK Albums Chart for three weeks. Hailed as a "modern masterpiece", it was certified 6× Platinum by BPI in 2004. The album demonstrates a thematic cohesion previously absent from Rea's work, with the majority of the tracks containing strong elements of social commentary, addressing alienation, violence and redemption. The second part of the two-part title track, "The Road to Hell (Pt. 2)", is one of Rea's most famous songs, and his only single to reach the UK Top 10. Geffen Records released the album in the US, adding the 1988 re-recording of "Let's Dance" and different cover artwork.

Production
The album built on the upswing Rea had experienced in the previous few years, starting with a surge of popularity in Ireland. "Without the Irish and Shamrock Diaries there would have been no Road To Hell," Rea said. The album was written and recorded within four weeks. He had a lot of trouble with the album arising out of the attitude of his record company, and he "recorded the next album – Auberge – before, as an agreement with Warner Brothers. So if Road To Hell didn’t work – and they said it won't – we would jump straight away to Auberge and forget about it. Of course, the beginning to Road To Hell is a gospel blues thing. Warner Brothers went, ‘This is going to be over in five minutes’. But I did stand me ground, and it went No.1".

Songs
Throughout the album there are repeated references to increasing societal dissolution and rising violence, including riots, murder and their irresponsible depiction on television news (You Must Be Evil), and "the perverted fear of violence" on city streets (The Road to Hell (Part 2)), where "it's all gone crazy" amid fears that "someone's gonna get killed out there" (Texas). Rea also targets industrial polluters' destruction of rivers (which "boil" with "poison"), and Thatcherism (which he also criticised on Shamrock Diaries' Steel River), dismissing notions of an "upwardly mobile freeway", or that promises will be delivered on (That's What They Always Say). A sense of suffocating doom suffuses the title track. Rea cries "We gotta get outta here!" (Texas) and "I'm getting out!" (That's What They Always Say), and struggles to find an escape in Texas and Looking for a Rainbow. A prominent theme is the impact all of this is having on his daughter, who was six at the time (You Must Be Evil, Tell Me There's a Heaven).

In an interview for the deluxe edition of the album (2019), Rea said You Must Be Evil was inspired by a journalistic friend of his recounting that a report on someone having been necklaced in riots in South Africa would only make the television news if footage of the horrific event was obtained. "You start to see news as pornography," Rea said. "'If we have something horrible, it's news!'... And I hate it, to this day." He recounts how his daughter saw the television report, and how his father-in-law tried to console her by saying that there is a heaven, which prompted Rea to write the song Tell Me There's a Heaven, which was subsequently used in a 1991 public information film for the NSPCC. Over the years, Texas has been played on classic rock/AOR radio stations in Texas, and is sometimes played as background music before Texas Rangers baseball games at Rangers Ballpark in Arlington. Daytona is about the Ferrari 365 GTB/4 Daytona (Rea races a different model Ferrari), in which he sings about the car metaphorically, with the engine and tyre noise from the car fading out toward the end of the song.

Cover art
The Leisure Process was commissioned to produce the artwork for the album cover by Max Hole. Creative Director John Carver personally handled the project, and commissioned and art directed the illustrator, Adrian Chesterman. Chesterman, was also responsible for creating cover art for, amongst others, Motörhead's 1979 Bomber album.

Track listing

(The 1989 US Geffen CD issue also includes the 1988 re-recording of "Let's Dance" slotted between tracks 8 and 9 listed above).

In 2019 the album, along with others in Rea's back catalogue, was remastered and reissued with a second CD of B-Sides, remixes and live tracks.

Personnel 
 Chris Rea – lead and backing vocals, keyboards, guitars
 Kevin Leach – keyboards, 
 Max Middleton – acoustic piano, Fender Rhodes, string arrangements
 Robert Ahwai – guitars
 Eoghan O'Neill – bass
 Martin Ditcham – drums, percussion
 Gavyn Wright – concertmaster and conductor 
 Karen Boddington – additional backing vocals
 Carol Kenyon – additional backing vocals
 Linda Taylor – additional backing vocals

Production 
 Chris Rea – producer
 Jon Kelly – producer
 Neil Amor – engineer
 Diane BJ Koné – engineer
 Willie Grimston – coordinator 
 The Leisure Process – artwork, sleeve design
 Jim Beach – management 
 John Knowles – management
 Paul Lilly – management

Charts

Certifications

References 

1989 albums
Chris Rea albums
Albums produced by Jon Kelly
Magnet Records albums